KWVF (102.7 FM) is a radio station broadcasting a classic hits format. Licensed to Guerneville, California, United States, the station serves the Santa Rosa area.  The station is currently owned by Redwood Empire Stereocasters.  

In June 2022, it was announced that KWVF and sister stations KZST, K256DA, and K273CU would be acquired by Amaturo Sonoma Media Group for $6 million.  The deal was expected to close during the third quarter of 2022.

References

External links

Mass media in Sonoma County, California
WVF
Mass media in Santa Rosa, California
2012 establishments in California